Eastmark High School is a junior high and high school in Mesa, Arizona, the second public high school operated by the Queen Creek Unified School District. It is located in the Eastmark master-planned community on the site of the former Mesa General Motors proving grounds.

History

In November 2017, voters in the Queen Creek Unified School District approved a $63 million bond package, as well as the repurposing of a 2014 bond, to allow the district to build a new high school and two new elementary schools, after a $95 million proposal had been defeated in 2016. The new schools, in the northern part of the district, would alleviate lengthy commutes. In August 2018, the district voted to name the school Eastmark High School, after the community in which it is located. Ground was broken on the high school on March 29, 2018, and the first day of classes for 800 students in grades 7 through 10 was July 31, 2019.

Curriculum
Eastmark is organized into four "Career Plan Academies", which allow students to specialize in STEM, medical and social health, business and marketing, and fine arts; each academy has its own setting and environment within the campus.

References

Schools in Maricopa County, Arizona
Public high schools in Arizona
2019 establishments in Arizona
Mesa, Arizona
Educational institutions established in 2019